Ian Craig Palmer (9 March 1966 – 22 July 2021) was a South African football coach.

Biography
Palmer was born in Johannesburg, but came from Riverlea. He played as a striker for Orlando Pirates until his career was cut short by a kidney ailment. He later managed teams in both the Premier Soccer League and the National First Division, last the National First Division club Milano United.

He received a kidney transplant in 2016. He died on 22 July 2021 due to COVID-19 complications.

References

1966 births
2021 deaths
Sportspeople from Johannesburg
Association football forwards
South African soccer players
Orlando Pirates F.C. players
South African soccer managers
Manning Rangers F.C. managers
Maritzburg United F.C. managers
Black Leopards F.C. managers
Santos F.C. (South Africa) managers
Chippa United F.C. managers
Deaths from the COVID-19 pandemic in South Africa